Adriana Chechik (born November 4, 1991) is an American former pornographic actress and media personality. By 2022, she had mostly retired from pornography in favor of video game livestreaming on Twitch. In October 2022, she broke her back when she jumped into a deceptively shallow foam pit at Twitch's annual convention TwitchCon, and thereafter documented her recovery.

Adult entertainment career
Chechik described having worked as a dancer at Scarlett's Cabaret in Hallandale Beach, Florida, at some point before working in porn. In May 2013, she signed a non-exclusive, one-year contract with Erotique Entertainment.

Chechik performed her first gangbang and double anal for Digital Sin's This Is My First... A Gangbang Movie, which was released on November 7, 2013. She also performed her first triple anal scene for the 2014 film Gangbang Me. On September 5, 2014, she launched her own website, AdrianaChechik.com, on the Cherry Pimps Network.

Chechik first appeared on The Howard Stern Show on August 12, 2014. She was also featured in the "Sexy/Skanky" page of the September 2014 issue of Cosmopolitan magazine. In 2019, she starred in an episode of the soft-core porn series LadyKiller TV, parodying the Nightmare on Elm Street series and directed by former Five Finger Death Punch drummer Jeremy Spencer. A 2019 Jezebel article on female ejaculation said that one of her film titles, "Adriana Chechik is the Squirt Queen", was a "widely accepted fact" in the pornography industry, and attributed Chechik's success to her abilities in that genre. In 2022, Indy100 described Chechik as "one of the most famous names in porn".

Maitland Ward recounted in her 2022 book, Rated X: How Porn Liberated Me from Hollywood, how Chechik was among those who helped Ward prepare for her first anal scene in the pornographic web series, Muse, in 2020. Chechik and Ward also performed in the scene together, which yielded awards in the industry for both performers. Chechik later described how her work in the industry had led to various injuries comparable to those received in a sports career, leading her to consider other career options. She established an OnlyFans profile, and was the first guest to appear on the Adam22 podcast "Plug Talk".

Streaming career and TwitchCon injury
By 2022, Chechik had mostly retired from pornography in favor of livestreaming video game sessions on Twitch. In August 2022, Twitch apologized to Chechik for a ban initially imposed on her shortly before a Fortnite event due to her prior career, and further explained it as having been due to her changing to a more revealing outfit during a streaming session. Chechik revealed that as a streamer, she spent thousands of dollars in donations seeking the attention of fellow streamer Dr Disrespect, of whom she is a fan. By October 2022, Chechik herself had amassed more than 3.8 million followers on Instagram and over 800,000 on Twitch.

Chechik attended the 2022 TwitchCon; while at the event on October 10, she participated in an interactive exhibit hosted by Lenovo Legion and Intel that involved attendees dueling in an arena and landing in a pit of foam cubes. However, the arena was not padded properly, causing people to land on concrete and resulting in various injuries. Chechik reported that she had broken her back after landing, and had to undergo surgery to set the fracture with a rod implant. Observers noted that Twitch publicly remained silent on the matter, failing to acknowledge Chechik's injury, and Chechik posted on social media that Twitch had said nothing to her privately about the incident. The incident also drew attention on the internet, including negative comments directed towards Chechik, prompting responses asserting that Chechik's former career in pornography should not be used to justify disrespect in the reporting of her injury. A tweet by esports news organization Dexerto making light of the injury based on Chechik's history was quickly retracted following backlash.

On October 29, it was reported that Chechik further revealed that it was discovered that she was pregnant when she was taken to the hospital, and that the pregnancy had to be terminated due to her injuries. In a Twitch stream following the accident on November 7, Chechik discussed her condition and prospects for recovery.

In January 2023, Chechik criticized Twitch streamer Adin Ross after Ross proposed to ban "hot tub" Twitch broadcasts, with Chechik describing Ross as "a man who clout chases after sex workers for views. One of the most disrespectful person I have ever met". Chechik also responded to criticism of her history as an adult performer by posting a picture of eleven awards she has won in the adult film industry.

Awards and nominations

References

Further reading

External links 

 
 
 
 

1991 births
American female erotic dancers
American pornographic film actresses
Living people
Twitch (service) streamers
21st-century American women